Alexander Pavlovich "Rags" Ragulin (5 May 1941 – 17 November 2004) was a Russian ice hockey player. He is considered one of the best defensemen in Soviet ice hockey history, winning three Olympic gold medals and ten world titles.

Playing career
Ragulin began training in ice hockey in 1957 with Khimik Voskrosensk, where he played with his brothers Anatoli and Mikhail. In 1962 he moved to CSKA Moscow and played with that team until retiring in 1973. With CSKA he won nine Soviet titles (1963–66, 1968, 1970–73) and five European Champions Cups (1969–73). During his 13 years with the Soviet national team, Ragulin played 239 matches and scored 29 goals. Besides the Olympic and world titles, he won nine gold (1963–70 and 1973) and three silver medals (1961, 1971, 1972) at the European Championships, and was selected as the best defenseman of the 1966 World Championships. In 1972 he played six out of eight games of the Summit Series between Canada and Soviet Union. After retiring from competitions, Ragulin coached SKA Novosibirsk and worked with children at the CSKA Moscow sports school. He was inducted to the IIHF Hall of Fame in 1997 and in 2001 received the Olympic Order in Silver.

References

Bibliography

External links 

 IIHF Hall of Fame profile on Ragulin
 Ragulin at Hockey CCCP International
 The Summit in 1972 profile on Ragulin
  Alexander Ragulin's profile in the Modern Museum of Sports features a lot of photos of him, his awards and decorations

1941 births
2004 deaths
Burials at Vagankovo Cemetery
HC CSKA Moscow players
HC Khimik Voskresensk players
Honoured Masters of Sport of the USSR
Ice hockey players at the 1964 Winter Olympics
Ice hockey players at the 1968 Winter Olympics
Ice hockey players at the 1972 Winter Olympics
IIHF Hall of Fame inductees
Medalists at the 1964 Winter Olympics
Medalists at the 1968 Winter Olympics
Medalists at the 1972 Winter Olympics
Olympic gold medalists for the Soviet Union
Olympic ice hockey players of the Soviet Union
Olympic medalists in ice hockey
Recipients of the Order "For Merit to the Fatherland", 3rd class
Recipients of the Order of Honour (Russia)
Soviet ice hockey defencemen
Ice hockey people from Moscow